Ridgley Ceylon Powers (December 24, 1836 – November 11, 1912) was a U.S. Army officer in the American Civil War and a Mississippi politician who served as that state's lieutenant governor in 1870 before becoming governor from 1871 to 1874.

Background
He was born in Mecca, Ohio, on Christmas Eve. He graduated from the University of Michigan and completed post-graduate work at Union College located in Schenectady, New York, in 1862.

Wartime participation
In the second year of the American Civil War, Powers enlisted into the United States Army as a private. He became a second lieutenant and later a captain in the 125th Ohio Volunteer Infantry. He served at the Third Battle of Chattanooga and in the Atlanta Campaign before returning with his regiment to Tennessee for much of the remainder of the war. He ended his military service as a colonel upon the end of the conflict.

Governorship
In 1865, the Ohioan settled in Noxubee County, Mississippi as a cotton planter, later becoming sheriff. During Reconstruction, Powers was elected the seventh lieutenant governor and began his term in 1870. Governor James L. Alcorn resigned the following year to accept a U.S. Senate seat, thereby making Powers the acting governor; he finished the unexpired term ending in 1874.

Death
Powers died in Los Angeles, California in 1912.

Notes

1836 births
1912 deaths
Union Army colonels
People of Ohio in the American Civil War
Republican Party governors of Mississippi
University of Michigan alumni
Union College (New York) alumni
People from Trumbull County, Ohio
People from Noxubee County, Mississippi
19th-century American politicians
Mississippi sheriffs